Marguerite Gurgand, née Marguerite Lévêque (born 1916, Tillou, Deux-Sèvres – 30 October 1981, Tillou), was a French writer, winner of the Prix du Livre Inter in 1981.

Selection of works 
1979: Nous n'irons plus au bois
1981: Les Demoiselles de Beaumoreau, prix du Livre Inter, prix Maison de la Presse, prix de l'Académie de Bretagne.
1982: L'Histoire de Charles Brunet (posthumous work completed by Jean-Noël Gurgand)

References

External links 
  Marguerite Gurgand on Babelio
 Marguerite Gurgand on INA.fr (5 March 1979)

20th-century French women writers
20th-century French novelists
Prix du Livre Inter winners
Prix Maison de la Presse winners
People from Deux-Sèvres
1916 births
1981 deaths